Pierre François Keraudren (15 May 1769 - 16 August 1858) was a scientist and physician in the French Navy. He was a native of Brest.

Biography 
From 1813 to 1845 he served as Inspector General to the Health Department of the Navy. Keraudren was a member of the Académie de Médecine, a consulting physician to Louis-Philippe and a member of the Moscow Society of Naturalists. He also belonged to medical, literary and scientific societies of Madrid, Louvain, Bologna, Orléans, Marseille, Toulon and Rochefort. On July 10, 1816 he was knighted in the Ordre de Saint-Michel.

Honours 
Keraudren served as the ship's official physician to the 1800–1803 Baudin expedition to Australia.
 The trumpet manucode, a species of birds found in New Guinea, was given the scientific name Manucodia keraudrenii by René-Primevère Lesson and Prosper Garnot in 1826.
 He also appears to be the person after whom the gastropods Oxygyrus keraudrenii (Charles-Alexandre Lesueur, 1817) and Pterotrachea keraudrenii (Fortune Eydoux and Louis François Auguste Souleyet, 1832) were named.

Works 
 Réflexions sommaires sur le scorbut, 1804
 Considérations et observations sur la syphilis dégénérée, 1811
 De la fièvre jaune observée aux Antilles [et] sur les vaisseaux du roi, Paris, 1823
 Mémoire sur les causes des maladies des marins, et sur les soins à prendre pour converser leur santé dans les ports et à la mer, 2nd ed., Paris, 1824 (1st ed., 1817)
 Du choléra-morbus de l'Inde ou mordéchi, Paris, 1824
 Mémoire sur le choléra-morbus de l'Inde, Baillière, Paris, 1831
 On the cholera morbus of India, The Lancet Office, London, 1831—"The most rational, unexaggerated, and impartial monograph concerning the Indian Cholera, yet presented to the public" (from the title page)

See also
 European and American voyages of scientific exploration

References

External links
 Obsèques de M. Kéraudren, Gros et Donnaud, 1858, Paris, on Gallica
 Record of the Léonore database

French medical writers
1769 births
1859 deaths
French Navy officers from Brest, France
French male non-fiction writers